Clásicos de la Provincia is the sixth album by Colombian singer/composer Carlos Vives. Released in Colombia in late 1993, and internationally on February 22, 1994, the album is a collection of Colombian vallenato standards. The album made Vives a superstar in Colombia and was his breakthrough in the Vallenato genre.

The album sold over 1,400,000 copies in Colombia, and 3 millions of copies worldwide in it first 6 months of been released.

Track listing
 "La gota fría" (E. Zuleta) – 3:33
 "Amor Sensible" (F. Molina) – 4:26
 "Alicia Adorada" (J. Valencia) – 4:15
 "La Hamaca Grande" (A. Pacheco) – 3:16
 "El Cantor De Fonseca" (C. Huertas) – 3:07
 "Matilde Lina" (L. Díaz) – 3:57
 "Altos Del Rosario" (A. Durán) – 3:56
 "Honda Herida" (R. Escalona) – 3:03
 "La Cañaguatera" (I. Carrillo) – 3:13
 "Lirio Rojo" (C. Ochoa) – 2:48
 "La Tijera" (L. Martínez) – 3:27
 "Compae Chipuco" (C. Gomez) – 3:16
 "Pedazo De Acordeón" (A. Durán) – 4:06
 "La Celosa" (F. Molina) – 4:12
 "Contestación A La Brasilera (fragmento)" (A. Zabaleta) – 0:49

Personnel 
Performance credits
Carlos Vives - Primary Artist, Director, Vocals
Egidio Cuadrado - Accordion, Vocals (Pedazo de Accordion), Backing Vocals
Ernesto "Teto" Ocampo - Acoustic Guitar, Electric Guitar, Guitar
Luis Ángel Pastor - Bass
John Jairo Lemus - Conga
Luis Pacheco - Conga, Guache, Tamboura, Tambourine
Alexa Hernández - Vocals, Choir
Amparo Sandino - Vocals Choir
Aníbal Rivera - Electric Guitar
Antonio Arnedo - Gaita, Soprano Saxophone
Eder Polo - Guacharaca
Bernardo Ossa - Keyboards, Percussion
Michael Egizi - Piano
Alfredo Rosado - Tamboura, Tambourine
Heberth Cuadrado - Violin, Vocals ("Pedazo De Acordeón")
Technical credits
Eduardo de Narváez - Arranger, Engineer, Producer
Ernesto "Teto" Ocampo - Arranger
Bernardo Ossa - Arranger
Carlos Vives - Arranger, Direction
Rafael Mejía - Art Direction
Phil Austin - Engineer
Jorge Díaz - Engineer
Robin Jenny - Engineer, Mastering
Manuel Riveira - Representation

Chart performance

Certifications and sales

See also 
List of best-selling albums in Colombia

References

External credits 
 Carlos Vives official website

1993 albums
1994 albums
Carlos Vives albums
Covers albums